Middletown Transit Corporation (dba Middletown Transit) is a public transit provider for the city of Middletown, Orange County, New York.

Service is provided on four routes, connecting at the Middletown Train Station, located on Railroad Avenue.  At this location, passengers can also connect to Coach USA Short Line bus service. Route 3 also serves the Middletown-Town of Wallkill MNR station, where passengers can connect to the Metro-North Railroad on their Port Jervis Line to New Jersey, Hoboken and New York City (via connection). It is owned and operated by TransitOrange, the transit provider for Orange County, New York

Routes 

 1 - Highland Ave-Tall Oaks-Summitfield Community Campus
 2 - David Moore Heights-Shoprite (Dolson Ave.)-Middlecrest Crossing-Amchir-OCCC
 3 - Walmart-Galleria-Crystal Run Healthcare-Orange Regional Medical Center
 4 - Senior Way-Aldi-Shoprite (211)-Price Chopper

Fleet

External links 
 Official Site
 Map and Schedule

References 

Transportation in New York (state) by city
Transportation in Orange County, New York
Middletown, Orange County, New York